Folk Songs for Far Out Folk is an album by Fred Katz originally released on Warner Bros. in 1959 and featuring orchestral jazz interpretations of African, Hebrew and American folk tunes.

Reception

Allmusic gave the album 4½ stars saying it was "highly recommended".

Track listing
All compositions are traditional
 "Mate'ka" - 6:35
 "Sometimes I Feel Like a Motherless Child" - 4:12 	
 "Been in the Pen So Long" - 3:09
 "Chili'lo" - 3:56
 "Rav's Nigun" - 3:00
 "Old Paint" - 4:55
 "Manthi-Ki" - 5:09
 "Baal Shem Tov" - 4:01
 "Foggy, Foggy Dew" - 5:21

Personnel
Fred Katz - orchestration, conductor, cello
Pete Candoli, Don Fagerquist, Irving Goodman - trumpet (tracks 1, 4 & 7)
Harry Betts, Bob Enevoldsen, George Roberts - trombone (tracks 1, 4 & 7)
Buddy Collette - flute (tracks 5 & 8) 
Paul Horn - flute, alto saxophone (tracks 5 & 8)
Jules Jacobs - oboe, clarinet (tracks 5 & 8) 
Justin Gordon - bassoon, bass clarinet (tracks 5 & 8) 
George Smith - clarinet (tracks 5 & 8) 
Mel Pollen - bass (tracks 2, 3, 5, 6, 8 & 9)
Johnny T. Williams - piano (tracks 2, 3, 6 & 9) 
Billy Bean - guitar (tracks 2, 3, 6 & 9)
Jerry Williams - drums (tracks 2, 3, 6 & 9)
Gene Estes - vibraphone, percussion (tracks 1-4, 6, 7 & 9)
Larry Bunker, Jack Constanzo, Carlos Mejia, Lou Singer - percussion (tracks 1, 4 & 7)

References

1959 albums
Fred Katz (cellist) albums
Warner Records albums